The 1986 International cricket season was from May 1986 to September 1986.

Season overview

May

India in England

July

New Zealand in England

References

1986 in cricket